Rare & Unreleased is a compilation album by Swamp Terrorists, released on 	January 12, 1999, by Metropolis Records.

Track listing

Personnel
Adapted from the Rare & Unreleased liner notes.

Swamp Terrorists
 Michael Antener (as STR) – programming
 Ane Hebeisen (as Ane H.) – lead vocals

Additional musicians
 Klaus Röthlisberger – recording (6, 12)

Release history

References

External links 
 Rare & Unreleased at Discogs (list of releases)

1999 compilation albums
Swamp Terrorists albums
Metropolis Records compilation albums